The Twelve Hours of Sebring International Grand Prix of Endurance for the Camel GT Challenge, was the second round of the 1978 IMSA GT Championship. The race was held at the Sebring International Raceway, on March 18, 1978. Victory overall went to the No. 9 Dick Barbour Racing Porsche 935 driven by Brian Redman, Charles Mendez, and Bob Garretson.

Race results
Class winners in bold.

Class Winners

References

12 Hours of Sebring
12 Hours of Sebring
12 Hours Of Sebring
12 Hours Of Sebring